St. Francois County is a county located in the Lead Belt region in the U.S. state of Missouri. As of the 2020 census, the population was  66,922. The largest city and county seat is Farmington. The county was officially organized on December 19, 1821. It was named after the St. Francis River. The origin of the river's name is unclear. It might refer to St. Francis of Assisi. Another possibility is that Jacques Marquette, a Jesuit who explored the region in 1673, named the river for the Jesuit missionary Francis Xavier. Marquette had spent some time at the mission of St. François Xavier before his voyage and, as a Jesuit, was unlikely to have given the river a name honoring the Franciscans.

St. Francois County comprises the Farmington, MO Micropolitan Statistical Area, which is also included in the St. Louis-St. Charles-Farmington, MO-IL Combined Statistical Area.

Adjacent counties 
Jefferson County (north)
Ste. Genevieve County (east)
Perry County (southeast)
Madison County (south)
Iron County (southwest)
Washington County (west)

Major highways 
 U.S. Route 67
 Route 8
 Route 32
 Route 47

National protected area 
Mark Twain National Forest (part)

Demographics

As of the census of 2000, there were 55,641 people, 20,793 households, and 14,659 families residing in the county. There were 24,449 housing units at an average density of 54 per square mile (21/km2). The racial makeup of the county was 96.14% White, 2.02% African American, 0.35% Native American, 0.31% Asian, 0.02% Pacific Islander, 0.23% from other races, and 0.92% from two or more races. Hispanic or Latino of any race were 0.80% of the population.

There were 20,793 households, out of which 32.60% had children under the age of 18 living with them, 54.90% were married couples living together, 11.30% had a female householder with no husband present, and 29.50% were non-families. 24.90% of all households were made up of individuals, and 11.20% had someone living alone who was 65 years of age or older. The average household size was 2.48 and the average family size was 2.94.

In the county, the population was spread out, with 24.00% under the age of 18, 9.20% from 18 to 24, 29.40% from 25 to 44, 22.50% from 45 to 64, and 14.90% who were 65 years of age or older. The median age was 37 years. For every 100 females there were 103.30 males. For every 100 females age 18 and over, there were 101.90 males.

The median income for a household in the county was $39,551, and the median income for a family was $47,923. Males had a median income of $29,961 versus $19,412 for females. The per capita income for the county was $19,047. Approximately 14.90% of the population and 11.00% of families were below the poverty line, including 19.80% under the age of 18 and 11.50% over the age of 65.

Religion
According to the Association of Religion Data Archives County Membership Report (2000), St. Francois County is a part of the Bible Belt with evangelical Protestantism being the majority religion. The most predominant denominations among residents in St. Francois County who adhere to a religion are Southern Baptists (45.48%), Roman Catholics (14.94%), and Methodists (8.37%).  There is also a small Orthodox Christian presence in the county, an example being Nativity of the Holy Virgin Mary Orthodox Church in Desloge, MO.

Catholic Churches in the county are Immaculate Conception in Park Hills, St. Joseph in Farmington, St. Joseph in Bonne Terre, St. John in Bismarck, and St. Anne in French Village.

2020 Census

Politics

Local
The Republican Party predominantly controls politics at the local level in St. Francois County. Republicans hold all but two of the county's elected positions.

State
St. Francois County is divided into three legislative districts in the Missouri House of Representatives.

 District 115 — Currently represented by Cyndi Buchheit-Courtway (R-Festus). It consists of the northern parts of the county, including Blackwell, French Village, and part of Park Hills.  

 District 116 — Currently represented by Dale Wright (politician) (R-Farmington). It consists of the southeastern section of the county, including part of Farmington.

 District 117 — Currently represented by Mike Henderson (R-Bonne Terre). It consists of the western parts of the county and includes the communities of Bismarck, Bonne Terre, Desloge, Doe Run, Iron Mountain Lake, Leadington, Leadwood, and parts of Farmington and Park Hills. 

All of St. Francois County is a part of Missouri's 3rd District in the Missouri Senate and is currently represented by Elaine Gannon (R-De Soto).

Federal

St. Francois County is included in Missouri's 8th Congressional District and is currently represented by Jason T. Smith (R-Salem) in the U.S. House of Representatives. Smith won a special election on Tuesday, June 4, 2013, to finish out the remaining term of U.S. Representative Jo Ann Emerson (R-Cape Girardeau). Emerson announced her resignation a month after being reelected with over 70 percent of the vote in the district. She resigned to become CEO of the National Rural Electric Cooperative.

Covid-19 controversy 
During the 2020 COVID-19 pandemic, the head of the St. Francois County Public Health Department described being driven to resign from her position by residents who refused to "accept the reality of the pandemic" and made “cowardly“ anonymous threats against her and her family.

Education
Of adults 25 years of age and older in St. Francois County, 72.4% possess a high school diploma or higher while 10.2% hold a bachelor's degree or higher as their highest level of educational attainment.

Public schools
Bismarck R-V School District – Bismarck
Bismarck Elementary School (PK–06)
Bismarck High School (07–12)
Farmington R-VII School District – Farmington
Jefferson Elementary School (01–04)
Lincoln Intermediate School (05–06)
Roosevelt Elementary School (01–04)
Truman Kindergarten (K)
Washington-Franklin Elementary School (01–04)
W.L. Johns Early Childhood Center (PK)
Farmington Middle School (07–08)
Farmington High School (09–12)
North St. Francois County R-I School District – Bonne Terre
North St. Francois County Primary School (PK–02) – Bonne Terre
North St. Francois County Parkside Elementary School (03–04) – Desloge
North St. Francois County Intermediate School (05–06) – Desloge
North St. Francois County Middle School (07–08) – Desloge
North St. Francois County High School (09–12) – Bonne Terre
St. Francois County Central R-III School District – Park Hills
Park Hills Central Elementary School (K–02)
West Elementary School (03–05)
Park Hills Central Middle School (06–08)
Park Hills Central High School (09–12)
West St. Francois County R-IV School District – Leadwood
West St. Francois County Elementary School (PK–05) – Park Hills
West St. Francois County Middle School (06–08) – Leadwood
West St. Francois County High School (09–12) – Park Hills

Private schools
St. Paul Lutheran School – Farmington – (PK–12) – Lutheran Church–Missouri Synod
St. Joseph School – Farmington – (K–08) – Roman Catholic
St. Joseph Elementary School – Bonne Terre – (PK–06) – Roman Catholic

Vocational-technical and other schools
Juvenile Detention Center – Farmington – (04–12)
Midwest Learning Center – Farmington – (04–12)
Unitec Career Center – Bonne Terre – (10–12)

Colleges and universities
Mineral Area College – Park Hills – A public, two-year community college.

Public libraries
 Bonne Terre Memorial Library

Communities

Cities

Bismarck
Bonne Terre
Desloge
Farmington (county seat)
Iron Mountain Lake
Leadington
Leadwood
Park Hills

Census-designated places
Doe Run
Frankclay
Goose Creek Lake
Knob Lick 
Lake Timberline
Terre du Lac
Wortham

Other unincorporated communities

 Blackwell 
 Cross Roads
 De Lassus
 French Village 
 Gumbo
 Halifax
 Hamilton Town
 Hazel Run
 Hurryville
 Iron Mountain 
 Koester
 Libertyville
 Loughboro
 Mineral City
 Middlebrook
 Mitchell
 Ogborn
 Old Mines
 Rock Springs
 Settletown
 Silver Springs
 Syenite

Former community
Haggai

See also
National Register of Historic Places listings in St. Francois County, Missouri

References

External links
 
 Digitized 1930 Plat Book of St. Francois County  from University of Missouri Division of Special Collections, Archives, and Rare Books

 
Regions of Greater St. Louis
1821 establishments in Missouri
Populated places established in 1821